The E1 European long-distance path, or just E1 path, is one of the European long-distance paths designated by the European Ramblers' Association. It begins in Norway at Nordkapp, and crosses the Kattegat between Sweden and Denmark by ferry. It passes through Denmark, Germany, and Switzerland to finish at Scapoli, Italy. This path was extended southwards to Sicily, in Italy in 2018.

Specific E1 waymarks are only seen in some locations such as at border crossings or at intersections with other paths, instead, the signs and markings of the local routes which make up the E1 are used. The path is described here in a north to south direction, although it is waymarked in both directions.

Norway
During 2010–2011, the Norwegian Trekking Association created a marked hiking trail from Nordkapp to Kautokeino. Also following the Nordkalottleden Trail and Grensesømmen, this extended the E1 all the way to the North Cape. The Nordkalottleden Trail (Kautokeino-Treriksrøysa-Abisko-Sulitjelma) and Grensesømmen (Sulitjelma-Røssvatnet-Børgefjell-Gressåmoen-Sylan-Grövelsjön) cross the Norwegian-Finnish and Norwegian-Swedish border several times. The route between Nordkapp and Grövelsjön does in part go in very remote areas with very few shelters and very little service available. Parts of the path are unmarked so that the hikers need to find their own route.

Norwegian kick-off
On 4 June 2013 Innovasjon Norge and Norwegian Trekking Association marked the Norwegian part of the path officially opened. The path stretches 2,105 km, and holds 60,000 waymarks on either cairns or tree stems all the way, except through Børgefjell National Park; regulations for Børgefjell National Park prohibits waymarks. The Børgefjell section is only marked on maps. This is also valid for the next section; from the southern tip of Børgefjell National Park in Nord-Trøndelag to Sætertjønnhytta in Steinkjer there are no waymarks by the desire of the Sami people and other considerations.

Route

Parts marked with cairns
Nordkapp → North Cape Tunnel

North Cape Tunnel → Stabbursdalen National Park

Stabbursdalen National Park → Masi

Masi → Kautokeino

Kautokeino → Reisa National Park

Reisa National Park → Käsivarsi Wilderness Area (Finland)

Käsivarsi Wilderness Area (Finland) → Kilpisjärvi (Finland)

Kilpisjärvi (Finland) → Malla Strict Nature Reserve (Finland)

Malla Strict Nature Reserve (Finland) →  Goldahytta near Treriksrøysa (Sweden, Finland, Norway)

Goldahytta near Treriksrøysa (Sweden, Finland, Norway) → Øvre Dividal National Park

Øvre Dividal National Park → Altevatnet

Altevatnet → Torneträsk (Sweden)

Torneträsk (Sweden) → Narvikfjellene

Narvikfjellene → Tysfjord

Tysfjord → Stora Sjöfallet National Park (Sweden)

Stora Sjöfallet National Park (Sweden) → Padjelanta National Park (Sweden)

Padjelanta National Park (Sweden) → Junkerdal National Park

Junkerdal National Park → Saltfjellet–Svartisen National Park

Saltfjellet–Svartisen National Park → Okstindan

Okstindan → Børgefjell National Park

Parts only marked on the map
The path goes through Børgefjell National Park and then, from the southern tip of Børgefjell National Park, in Røyrvik, Nord-Trøndelag continues through Røyrvik, over Steinfjellet in Namsskogan and back into Røyrvik. The path continues along Tunnsjøen to Skorovatn in Namsskogan again, over Gruvefjellet to Midtre Nesåvatnet, and then under Nesåpiggen in Røyrvik again. Then, it continues to Skjelbredtunet in Lierne and over Blåfjella–Skjækerfjella National Park to the bordelake Holderen in Snåsa. Gaundalen airport over Skjækerfjella to Sætertjønnhytta in Steinkjer by the lake Skæhkerenjaevrie, close to the geographical centre of Norway there are no hallmarks by wish of Sami people and other considerations.

Sweden

Responsible organisation: Svenska Turistföreningen

Route
The path starts at Grövelsjön (Lake Grövel), which lies near the Norwegian-Swedish border near Idre. It uses a series of connecting established paths down to Varberg, a city on the coast south of Göteborg, from where the ferry to Denmark sails.

From its start it follows Vasaloppsleden, Siljansleden, southern part of the Malingsbo-Kloten Rundan, Bergslagsleden, Västra Vätterleden along the western edge of lake Vättern, a short part of Södra Vätterleden at Ulricehamn and a connecting trail to Sjuhäradsleden, then Knalleleden, Vildmarksleden and Bohusleden to Göteborg and Hallandsleden to Varberg.

Total length of the path in Sweden: appr. 1200 km

From the start at Grövelsjön other established walking paths go further north, for example reaching Hemavan where the well-known Kungsleden goes to Abisko in the far north Sweden.

Practical
The route consist mostly of narrow footpaths running through the forested hills of middle Sweden and avoids most population centers. There are not many shops along the route so it may be necessary to plan or go off-route for supplies. The paths are printed on the Swedish topographic maps so special maps or guidebooks are not necessary. Wild camping in Sweden is allowed. Alternatively there are many vindskydd along the route. These are simple three-sided log cabins with the open side facing a campfire. They are often in idyllic places and are free to use.

External links
 STF—Svenska Turistföreningen
 Bergslagsleden—Bergslagsleden website
 E1 in Sweden (in Swedish)

Denmark

Responsible organisation: Dansk vandrelaug

Route
The ferry from Varberg in Sweden arrives in Grenå. The link from Grenå to Vrads Sande on the Hærvej was inaugurated in 2006. The first part of this new stage is the Mols route to Århus. Then it uses the Århus – Silkeborg route via Skanderborg to Virklund and from Virklund to Vrads on the Horsens Silkeborg naturstien. At Vrads it connects to the historic Hærvej which is followed south to the German border. It meets up with the European walking route E6 near Padborg. From Bov a part of the Gendarmstien is used to link the Hærvejen to the German Ochsenweg. The border is crossed between Kruså and Kupfermühle.
The total length in Denmark is 325 km.

Practical
Camping in the wild is not allowed in Denmark. There are however primitive campsites (Danish: lejrplads) along the route which commonly have room to pitch a few tents, a water tap or pump, and a simple toilet, and they are often free to use. The route takes the walker along easy going paths and quiet roads through the rolling Danish landscape. It often visits larger towns so other forms of accommodation are possible and supplies are no problem.
You can also use one of the many shelters, which are placed along the route. You may find them on Waymarkedtrails.

External links
ERA E-path E1 in Denmark—European Ramblers Association data on E1 in Denmark
Dansk vandrelaug—Danish walking organisation
Hærvejen –– website of the Hærvejen
Waymarkedtrails.org

Germany
In Germany regional walking organisations are responsible for waymarking and maintaining the E1 in their area, with the Verband Deutscher Gebirgs- u. Wandervereine e. V. as umbrella organisation.

Total length of the path in Germany: 1829.5 km

Schleswig-Holstein and Hamburg
Responsible organisation: Wanderverband Norddeutschland

On the first section the E1 European walking route runs together with the E6 route. The path crosses the border at Kupfermühle near Flensburg and leads through the towns of Flensburg and Schleswig. It touches the "Naturpark Hüttener Berge" and runs parallel to the coast of the Baltic Sea until it reaches the city of Kiel. After Kiel it incorporates the towns of Preetz, Plön, Malente-Gremsmühlen, Eutin and Neustadt on its way to Lübeck. It goes on via Ratzeburg and Mölln until Güster – here the path of the E1 branches away from the E6. In Hamburg the route crosses the river Elbe.

The Schlei – Eider – Elbe Wanderweg is known as the west alternative (Westvariant) of the E1 between Flensburg and Hamburg. It runs parallel to the North Sea coast and the Elbe instead of the Baltic.

Detailed route:
Kupfermühle – Sankelmark – Schleswig – Ascheffel – Aschau – Strande – Kiel – Preetz – Niederkleveez – Schönwalde am Bungsberg – Klingberg – Kreutzkamp – Krummesee – Mölln – Güster – Witzhave – Hamburg

Lower Saxony
Hamburg – Neugraben-Fischbek – Harburg Hills – Buchholz in der Nordheide – Undeloh – Soltau – Müden – Celle – Fuhrberg – Otternhagen – Haste – Springe – Hameln – Bösingfeld

Length of the route: 339 km

North Rhine-Westphalia
Bösingfeld – Lemgo – Horn-Bad Meinberg – Herbrahmwald – Blankerode – Marsberg – Wirminghausen – Schwalefeld – Altastenburg – Bad Berleburg – Bad Laasphe – Lahnhof – Siegen – Herdorf

Length of the route: 276 km

Rhineland-Palatinate (Rheinland-Pfalz)
Herdorf – Fuchskaute – Unnau – Selters – Montabaur – Nassau – Balduinstein – Michelbach – Idstein

Length of the route: 169 km

Hessen
Idstein – Oberursel – Frankfurt-Sachsenhausen – Dreieichenhain – Ober-Ramstadt – Bensheim – Nieder-Liebersbach – Heidelberg

Length of the route: 166.5 km

Baden-Württemberg
The E1 in the Black Forest follows pre-existing long-distance paths. Initially it follows the Schwarzwald Hochweg Westweg (Westway) from the town of Heidelberg to Schlierbach – Rauenberg – Odenheim – Bretten – Pforzheim – Dobel – Forbach via Kaiser-Wilhelm-Tower (984 m lookout tower) – Lake Mummelsee via Badener Höhe (1001 m) – Hausach – Titisee (Lake Titi) – peak of Feldberg (1487 m) – Schluchsee to Kappel. From there it follows the Freiburg-Lake Constance Black Forest Trail to Boll, Riedöschingen, Engen, Singen, Langenrain and Konstanz.

Length of this section: 464 km

External links
A hike along the path of E1 in Germany – from Henri Floor (a Dutch website).
A hike in the Black Forest – Walking the section of the European Long Distance Path E1 (Black Forest section referred to as Westweg) from Heidelberg-Schlierbach to the Feldberg.
E1 in Germany North (only in German)

Switzerland

Responsible organisation: Schweizer Wanderwege.

Route
Switzerland has a dense network of walking path nodes with signposted junctions. The E1 is only rarely separately waymarked on these signposts, but the national routes which the E1 follows are generally marked. The route of the E1 leads from Konstanz to Wattwil, and then follows the Via Jacobi (part of St James's Way) to reach Lake Lucerne at Brunnen. From Brunnen it follows the shore of the lake to Flüelen on the Swiss Path. From Flüelen to the Italian border, the Trans-Swiss Trail is used, waymarked as Fernwanderweg 2. The path then climbs over the St. Gotthard Pass, the highest point of the path at 2091 m. After following the Strada alta Leventina through Ticino, the E1 reaches the border at Porto Ceresio, Italy.

Total length of the route in Switzerland: 348 km.

External links
Wandersite.ch Europäischer Fernwanderweg E1 durch die Schweiz (in German)

Italy
Responsible organisation: Federazione Italiana Escursionismo

Via Lake Maggiore into the Ligurian Mountains (there is a spur to the Mediterranean at Genova) to Passo della Bochetta.
Length of the route: appr. 200 km

Through the eastern part of Ligurian Mountains (Alta Via dei Monti Liguri) to Passo dei Due Santi.
Length of the route: appr. 150 km

Along the Apennine ridge through Tuscany (Grande Escursione Appenninica) to Bocca Trabaria.
Length of the route: appr. 400 km

Along Apennine ridge through Umbria to Castelluccio.
Length of the route: appr. 200 km

Through mountains along the Abruzzo/Lazio border: Simbruini, Ernici, Abruzzo national park to Lazio/Molise border at Scapoli.
Length of the route: appr. 200 km

Total length of the route in Italy: 1150 km

There is a plan to lengthen the route of E1 through southern Italy to Sicily along the Apennines.

Notes

References

External links
 Traildino
 E1 on European Ramblers Association website
 Hiking Europe – Information about E1 stages and accommodation (English and German)
 Life Time Trails about E1

Hiking trails in Norway
Hiking trails in Sweden
Hiking trails in Denmark
Hiking trails in Switzerland
Hiking trails in Germany
European long-distance paths